Andrei Aleksandrovich Kolesnikov (born 11 February 1984) is a Russian former footballer.

Club career
He made his Russian Premier League debut for FC Torpedo Moscow on 22 April 2006 in a game against FC Luch-Energiya Vladivostok.

External links
  Player page on the official FC Tom Tomsk website
 

1984 births
People from Valuyki, Belgorod Oblast
Living people
Russian footballers
Russia youth international footballers
Russia under-21 international footballers
Association football defenders
FC Dynamo Moscow reserves players
FC Ural Yekaterinburg players
FC Torpedo Moscow players
FC Luch Vladivostok players
Russian Premier League players
FC Fakel Voronezh players
FC Chernomorets Novorossiysk players
FC Salyut Belgorod players
FC Rubin Kazan players
FC Tom Tomsk players
FC Neftekhimik Nizhnekamsk players
FC Energomash Belgorod players
FC MVD Rossii Moscow players
Sportspeople from Belgorod Oblast